The 1948 Cork Intermediate Hurling Championship was the 39th staging of the Cork Intermediate Hurling Championship since its establishment by the Cork County Board in 1909.

Midleton won the championship following a 6-04 to 1-01 defeat of Shanballymore in the final. This was their first ever championship title.

References

Cork Intermediate Hurling Championship
Cork Intermediate Hurling Championship